The 1996 International Touring Car Championship was the thirteenth season of premier German touring car championship and also only first and final season under the moniker of International Touring Car Championship. It was for FIA Class 1 Touring Cars and it was contested by Mercedes-Benz, Alfa Romeo and Opel. It was formed of the Deutsche Tourenwagen Meisterschaft series that ran both a short German & International-based series in 1995. These were fused together to form the International Touring Car Championship (abbreviated to ITC). The eventual champion was Manuel Reuter driving an Opel Calibra, and Opel won the manufacturer's championship.

Season summary

All three manufacturers were relatively equally-matched and competitive all season, with Opel's other winning drivers besides Reuter being the experienced Hans-Joachim Stuck, who took a double victory in Helsinki, and 1994 champion Klaus Ludwig who repeated the feat at Norisring. Alfa Romeo came second to Opel in the standings, with former Benetton Formula One driver Alessandro Nannini taking a convincing seven victories, including four-in-a-row midseason, to place third in the championship. Team-mate and compatriot Nicola Larini could manage just two wins late in a season blighted with retirements, meaning the Ferrari test driver would not be a feature in the title battle.

Mercedes-Benz may have finished third and last in the constructors standings, but were every bit as competitive as their two rivals. Reigning DTM & ITC champion Bernd Schneider racked up four wins, including a double at Diepholz, en route to second in the championship, though 1995's DTM runner-up Jörg van Ommen scored a solitary win in a lacklustre campaign. Their junior team-mates – future Stewart driver Jan Magnussen and IndyCar Series star to-be Dario Franchitti – also scored a win apiece in the first and last rounds of the series respectively. This meant the Scot placed a creditable fourth in the standings, whilst the Dane's mid-season defection to CART along with a number of retirements served to prevent him from challenging for the title. Others who impressed but failed to win a race included sometime Benetton and Sauber driver JJ Lehto for Opel, young Italian Giancarlo Fisichella, who combined an assured sophomore tin-top season for Alfa Romeo with a part-season for the Minardi F1 team, and former Porsche Supercup champion  Uwe Alzen who completed the championship top ten by finishing in eighth for Opel.

Looking further down the field, ex-Tyrrell and Jordan F1 driver Stefano Modena endured an average season with Alfa Romeo, whilst fellow Alfa Romeo driver and former BTCC champion Gabriele Tarquini suffered from appalling luck which severely hampered his title tilt despite taking a convincing victory at Silverstone. Christian Danner also disappointed for Alfa Romeo, whilst the respective team-mates of Reuter and Schnieder – Le Mans winner Yannick Dalmas and former DTM champion Kurt Thiim – curiously also had torrid seasons. The latter was replaced at the end of the season, along with future F1 driver Alexander Wurz and Jason Watt, as all three manufacturers elected to enter a local driver each during the last two events at Interlagos and Suzuka. Among these, German F3 regular Max Wilson was the most impressive, the Brazilian finishing second on home turf at Interlagos.

In the end, it was consistency that gifted Reuter the title – he scored points during the first fifteen races of the season, and only failed to do so six times all season. In comparison, Schneider failed to score nine times and Nannini twelve, despite both taking more wins with four and seven respectively as opposed to Reuter's three.

Despite boasting a tremendously strong driver line-up, consisting largely of former F1 drivers, and ostensibly robust manufacturer support, the series suffered from poor media exposure and television coverage, which along with lacklustre spectator attendance figures meant there was comparatively little money coming into the series in comparison to the huge cost of running a 'Class 1' touring car. This was exacerbated by two long journeys to Interlagos, and Suzuka, circuits located in countries where some the competing cars weren't actually sold. This meant that Alfa Romeo and Opel announced in September they would pull out at the end of the series, despite having hitherto committed themselves to compete until the end of 1997. With Mercedes-Benz the only remaining manufacturer committed for 1997, the series was cancelled. It wouldn't be until 2000 that the championship was resurrected, albeit as the DTM which was based firmly in Germany.

Teams and drivers

Schedule and results

Drivers Championship standings

† Drivers did not finish the race, but were classified as they completed over 90% of the race distance.

Note: bold signifies pole position, italics signifies fastest lap. Grid order for race 2 was decided by the finishing order in race 1.

Notes
 Points System: 20–15–12–10–8–6–4–3–2–1 for the Top 10 drivers in each race. No extra points awarded.

Manufacturers Championship Standings
Final placings in the 1996 FIA Touring Car International Championship for Manufacturers were:

References

External links
 1996 International Touring Car Championship standings from motorsport.com

Deutsche Tourenwagen Masters seasons
Int
1996 International Touring Car Championship season